National Assembly elections were held in Nepal on 26 January 2022 in order to elect 19 of the 20 retiring Class II members of the National Assembly, the upper house of the Federal Parliament of Nepal. Members of the National Assembly are elected through indirect ballot and serve six year terms with one third of the members retiring every two years. However, the retiring members served only four year terms due to the entire house being elected in 2018 when a lottery was held to determine two, four and six year term members.

Electoral system
Eight members of the National Assembly are elected from each of the seven provinces of Nepal and 3 members are appointed by the President for a total of 59 members. Composition of members from each province have to include three women, a Dalit, and a disabled or member of a minority. The three remaining are categorized as open/other candidates. All members elected from this election must be from the same category as the retiring members.

Members were elected by first-past-the-post voting by an electoral college composed of members of the respective provincial assembly and Chairperson/Mayor and Vice Chairperson/Deputy Mayor of the local levels within the province. Each provincial assembly member vote has a weight of forty eight whereas each Chairperson/Mayor/Vice Chairperson/Deputy Mayor vote have a weight of eighteen. This electoral college will elect 19 members while 1 member, whose term will also end concurrently, will be nominated by the President on the recommendation of the Government of Nepal.

Qualification for members 
According to  Article 87 of the Constitution, a person who meets the following criteria is qualified to become a member of the National Assembly:
 citizen of Nepal,
 completed the age of thirty five years, 
 not having been convicted of a criminal offense involving moral turpitude,
 not being disqualified by any Federal law, and
 not holding any office of profit.

Election Timeline 
The key dates are listed below

Alliance

+



Results 
As the creation of the Nepal Communist Party was reverted by the Constitutional court, its 47 seats total in 2020 are shown here by the subsequent party of its members : CPN (UML), CPN (Maoist Centre) and CPN (US).

Detailed

See also
2022 elections in Nepal

Notes

References

National Assembly
Nepal